Idar State, also known as Edar, was a princely state located in present-day Gujarat state of India. During the British era, it was a part of the Mahi Kantha Agency, within the Gujarat Division of Bombay Presidency.

History

Idar State was a princely state that was founded in 1257. Its rulers were Rathore Rajputs. On the question of the succession of the state of Idar, the Sultan of Gujarat, Muzaffar Shah, and  Rana Sanga of Mewar supported rival claimants. In 1520, Sanga established Raimal on the Idar throne, with Muzaffar Shah sending an army to install his ally Bharmal. Sanga himself arrived in Idar and the Sultan's army was beaten back. Rana pursued the Gujarati army and plundered the towns of Ahmadnagar and Visnagar of Gujarat, chasing the Sultan's army as far as Ahmedabad. the Rathore's ruled Idar for 12 generations until they were defeated by the Mughals under Murad Baksh in 1656. Idar then became a part of the Mughal Province of Gujarat. In 1729 Anand Singh and Rai Singh, brothers of the Maharaja of Jodhpur, captured Idar by force. They captured the districts of Idar, Ahmednagar, Morasa, Baad, Harsol, Parantij and Vizapur. Five other districts were made tributaries of their new state. The state was soon annexed by the Marathas under Damaji Gaekwad in 1753 and Anand Singh was killed in battle. When Rai Singh got to know about his brother's death he gathered a force and once again captured Idar; he placed Anand Singh's son on the throne and became his guardian. After Rai Singh's death in 1766, the Marathas once again threatened Idar upon which Rao Seo Sinh, son of Anand Singh, agreed to hand over the districts of Parantij and Vizapur to the Peshwa and Morasa, Baad and Harsol to the Gaekwads.

In 1875 Idar state had a revenue of £60,000 and paid a tribute of £3,034 to the Gaekwads of Baroda State. The population of the state in 1875 was 217,382. The rulers were Rathor Rajputs of the Joda family and were entitled to a gun salute of 15 guns.

In 1924 Idar was made part of the Western India States Agency. It was transferred to the Rajputana Agency in the early 1940s. On 10 June 1948 Idar became part of the Indian Union. In 1949 it was dissolved and split between Sabar Kantha district and Mehsana district, which were at that point in Bombay State. Both districts were included in Gujarat when it was formed in 1960.

References

External links

13th-century establishments in India
1250s establishments in Asia
1948 disestablishments in India
Rathores
Princely states of Gujarat
Sabarkantha district